Montfort School, Kolathur, is a higher-secondary school for boys and girls (Co-ed) run by the Montfort Brothers of St. Gabriel in the town of Kolathur, near Mettur, in Salem district, Tamil Nadu, India. It follows the Matriculation board of Education system.

Brothers of Christian Instruction of St Gabriel schools
Catholic secondary schools in India
Christian schools in Tamil Nadu
High schools and secondary schools in Tamil Nadu
Education in Salem district